Mazen al-Tumeizi ( also transliterated Mazen Tumesi, c. July 5, 1979 – September 12, 2004) was a Palestinian journalist, killed on-camera in Baghdad, Iraq by U.S. helicopter gunfire while covering the Haifa Street helicopter incident.  His last moments were recorded by the camera he had been reporting into, including his dying words as he gasped to his cameraman. The graphic tape of his death sparked an increase in concern for journalists reporting in occupied Iraq, as well as outrage in the Arab world.

Tumeizi was a Palestinian reporter for Saudi-owned news networks al-Arabiya and al-Ikhbariya.  He was the third al-Arabiya journalist to be killed in Iraq by U.S. forces, after reporter Ali al-Khatib and cameraman Ali Abdelaziz.

Tumeizi died during the Haifa Street helicopter incident. The footage shows Tumeizi covering a group of curious Iraqis ululating around the wreckage of a U.S. Bradley Fighting Vehicle that had been recently abandoned after suffering damage from an improvised roadside bomb attack.  A loud explosion can then be heard, followed by layers of smoke and debris. Tumeizi collapses from the impact, falling toward the camera, and the camera's lens is spattered with his blood as he falls.  The cameraman (identified by Tumeizi as "Seif") loses focus, but Tumeizi's last words are captured in the camera's audio feed:

I'm going to die. I'm going to die. Seif. Seif. I'm going to die.

"Seif" would later be identified as Reuters camera operator Seif Fouad, who was also injured in a subsequent rocket strike.

Reactions 
Mazen al-Tumeizi was among 11 civilians killed in the Haifa Street attack on Sept. 12, 2004, after fighting between insurgents and members of the 1st Battalion, 9th Cavalry Regiment, 1st Cavalry Division when a United States Apache helicopter was called in to destroy a damaged Bradley Fighting Vehicle to prevent insurgents from looting its weapons and ammunition.

International news agencies reported that Tumeizi began filming the abandoned vehicle's location three hours after it had been ambushed, a claim disputed by the U.S. military.  The official military report places the time of the helicopter strike only 40 minutes after the Bradley's being ambushed, and states that the airstrike on the wrecked Bradley was called "to prevent looting and harm to the Iraqi people." 

Naim Tubasi, chief of the Palestinian Journalists' Union, suggested Tumeizi's killing to have been a deliberate targeting of Arab journalists in Iraq, and called Tumeizi's killing "one more American crime in Iraq."   Najwa Kasem, an Al Arabiya anchor and former colleague of Tumeizi, reacted to American suggestions that Tumeizi was "one of the terrorists" by describing them as "really surprising and sad."

External links 
 Media spotlight on Baghdad deaths, September 13, 2004, BBC News
 Fatal sign-off: Reporter's last words in Iraq mayhem, The Sydney Morning Herald
 Interview with Al Arabiya reporter Najwa Kasem, former colleague of Tumeizi, Democracy Now!
 Footage of Mazen Tumeisi's death, BBC

2004 deaths
Palestinian journalists
Journalists killed while covering the Iraq War
Year of birth uncertain
Filmed killings